Marcus Birkemose (born on 9 October 2003) is an international speedway rider from Denmark.

Speedway career 
Birkemose became the European Junior Champion after winning the 2020 Individual Speedway Junior European Championship.

References 

Living people
2003 births
Danish speedway riders